Route 740 is a  long mostly north–south secondary highway in the southwestern portion of New Brunswick, Canada. Most of the route is in Charlotte County.

The route starts in a densely wooded area in Basswood Ridge at Route 730. The road travels southeast through Hayman Hill, past Blackland, to Heathland and Four Corners before ending in Five Corners at the eastern terminus of Route 725 and the southern terminus of Route 735 close to Saint Stephen.

See also

References

740
740